Ivan Yefimovich Nikulin (1898 – September 8, 1937) was a Soviet Kombrig (brigade commander) and division commander. In November 1936 he was transferred to the Special Red Banner Far Eastern Army. During the Great Purge, he was arrested on June 13, 1937 and later executed. After the death of Joseph Stalin, he was rehabilitated in 1957.

Bibliography
 Краснознамённый Киевский. Очерки истории Краснознамённого Киевского военного округа (1919—1979). Издание второе, исправленное и дополненное. Киев, издательство политической литературы Украины. 1979. С.14 - 28.12.1917 сформирован полк Червонного казачества Украины, 18.07.1919 полк Червонного казачества развёрнут в бригаду, 1.11.1919 бригада Червонного казачества переформирована в 8-ю дивизию Червонного казачества.
 Горбатов А.В. Годы и войны. — М.: Воениздат, 1989. Книга на сайте: http://militera.lib.ru/memo/russian/gorbatov/index.html
 Дубинский Илья. ПРИМАКОВ. Выпуск 2. (445). Основные даты жизни и деятельности В. М. Примакова. (см. lib.rus.ec/b/105117/read) 
 Червонное казачество. Воспоминания ветеранов. Ордена Трудового Красного Знамени Военное издательство Министерства обороны СССР. Москва, 1969, редакторы-составители Е. П. Журавлев, М. А. Жохов.

Sources
 Червоні аватари України: уніформа орлів Примакова.
 1-й кавалерийский корпус Червонного казачества имени ВУЦИК и ЛКСМ Украины.
 Кавалерийские корпуса РККА
 Кавалерийская дивизия 14-й армии, с 4.12.19 г. – 8-я кавалерийская дивизия Червонного казачества, с 6.05.22 г. – 1-я кавалерийская Запорожская Червонного казачества Краснознаменная дивизия имени Французской компартии.
 Репрессированные военнослужащие Красной Армии. Комбриги.
 Приказ НКО СССР по личному составу армии от 26 ноября 1935 года. № 2394.

1898 births
1937 deaths
Soviet military personnel of the Russian Civil War
Great Purge victims from Russia
People executed by the Soviet Union
Soviet rehabilitations
Soviet kombrigs